Mint Chalida Vijitvongthong (August 8, 1993) is a Thai actress and model.

Acting career 
Chalida Vijitvongthong is of Chinese and Indian descent. She first started her acting career as a model in television commercials and made her acting breakthrough when she appears in 4 Huajai Hae Koon Kao or 4 Hearts of the Mountain in Channel 3 as Cher-Aim where she was paired with rookie actor Prin Suparat and gained popularity having a fan-base together with co-star Prin Suparat known as M&M or MM which stands for both their nicknames Mint and Mark.

By 2011, she once again reunited with Pathapee Leh Ruk co-star Prin Suparat and Urassaya Sperbund in a Western-style drama called Tawan Deard but this time not as his leading lady, where she plays Ploy Kwan, Urassaya's younger sister. In the same year, she got cast in Ruk Pathiharn which she co-star with Alex Rendell as her leading man and Kimberly Ann Voltemas as one of the leading ladies in 4 Huajai Hae Koon Kao.

By 2012, she was once again reunited with Prin Suparat whom she worked with, in her other 2 dramas, this time in Nuer Mek 2 the sequel of 2010s Nuer Mek which starred Chakrit Yamnarm and Khemapsorn Sirisukha, this drama is cut off by the Thai government due "Political Issues". Chalida was then cast in a 5 series drama of Channel 3 called Suparburoot Juthathep revolving around the story of 5 brothers which she starred together with rookie actor James Ma who is having his acting debut in this drama, in this drama Chalida was praised by her improved acting skills despite her acting issues in her first leading role in Pathapee Leh Ruk.

By 2014 and 2015, Chalida was cast in the romantic-comedy drama Cubic in which she played the character of Ruthainak a kind-hearted yet outgoing young lady who is replaced by her father with her sister in order to pay for their debt with the mafia boss Lin Lan Ser which was played by rookie actor Tanin Manunsilp who also plays one of the 5 brothers in Suparburoot Juthatep which he won rising actor. After Cubic, Chalida was set to play in Kaew Ta Warn Jai opposite Pakorn Chatborirak, followed by the drama Song Huajai Nee Puea Tur which she will play together with famous Thai actor Mario Maurer.

Filmography

Dramas

Awards and nominations

Discography

References 

1993 births
Living people
Chalida Vijitvongthong
Chalida Vijitvongthong
Chalida Vijitvongthong
Chalida Vijitvongthong
Chalida Vijitvongthong
Chalida Vijitvongthong
Chalida Vijitvongthong